Why I Hate Religion, But Love Jesus is a viral video created by Christian speaker Jefferson Bethke, who uploaded his work that rose him to fame onto YouTube and GodTube, under the screenname bball1989. The video has thus far received more than 34 million views.

The theme of the video revolves around "the difference between Jesus and false religion." Underneath his video, Bethke delineated its purpose:

Jefferson Bethke repudiated those who used his video to criticize the Church, stating "The Church is His vehicle to reach a lost world. A hospital for sinners. Saying you love Jesus but hate the Church, is like a fiancé saying he loves his future bride, but hates her kids."  Nevertheless, the author of the video stated that he wanted to expose the legalism prevalent in many houses of worship. The popular rapper Lecrae, on his Facebook, encouraged his fans to think about the video by linking an article titled "Does Jesus hate religion? Kinda, sorta, not really" by Kevin DeYoung who had, since writing it, spoken with Jefferson Bethke about it and the video.

Popularity
The four-minute video had received 6 million views three days after its release on January 10, 2012, as well as 64,000 comments.  and by January 23, the video was viewed over 16 million times.
Jefferson Bethke's videos "Sex, Marriage, & Fairytales", "Sexual Healing" and "Death Of Yolo" are another ones of his most popular works, receiving over 6 million, over 5.2 million and 1.9 million views respectively.

References

External links
Why I Hate Religion, But Love Jesus video on YouTube

Christian missions
Viral videos
2012 in Christianity
2012 works
2012 YouTube videos
Mars Hill Church
Sociology of religion
Films critical of religion
Cultural depictions of Jesus